Edward Peter Baily (St John's Wood, London 18 January 1852 – Tupsley, Herefordshire 21 January 1941) was an English first-class cricketer.

Edward Baily was educated at Harrow and Caius College, Cambridge. He represented Cambridge University (being awarded two blues) in nine matches (1872–1874) and Middlesex in first-class cricket as a right-handed batsman and wicketkeeper.

He became a preparatory school headmaster at Limpsfield in Surrey before retiring in 1906 to Herefordshire.

His son Robert Baily represented Cambridge University and Surrey.

References

External links
 Cricinfo
 Cricketarchive.com Cricket Archive

1852 births
1941 deaths
People from St John's Wood
Cambridge University cricketers
English cricketers
Middlesex cricketers
People educated at Harrow School
Alumni of Gonville and Caius College, Cambridge